The Reifferscheider Hof or Linneper Hof (inaccurate also frequent: Lenneper Hof) was a manor of the Reifferscheid, Linnep, Sayn-Wittgenstein and  families in erbvogteilichen Hacht district on the Domhof in Cologne, which was laid down in the 1740s. It was inhabited by members of the Cologne Cathedral Chapter and was a emphyteusis of the cathedral monastery. Today, the area is part of the grounds of the Romano-Germanic Museum.

History 

The Reifferscheider or Linneper Hof was a hereditary monastery yard (erffcloisterhoiff) of the Cologne cathedral monastery, which was used as a canonic house. It was located immediately south of the choir building of Cologne cathedral on the Domhof, east of the church of St. Johannis in Curia. The High Court was located to the west of this church.

In the house, next to which the old Carolingian  still stood until 1248, lived the canon Herimann von Heppendorf (d. 1257), a brother of  Gerhard II. von Heppendorf (d. 1259). Both were the sons of Hermann II. (IV.) von Heppendorf-Alpen (d. 1234/35) and Agnes von Linnep.

The house was subsequently inhabited by members of the Reifferscheid family; as Cologne canons, Heinrich I (d. 1318), Heinrich II (d. after 1330), Heinrich I (d. 1318) and Heinrich II (d. after 1330) are mentioned and Gerhard von Reifferscheid (d. after 1371). The former canon Ludwig von Reifferscheid (d. 1402), who had renounced his canonry in 1374 and married, sold his court at the Domhof in Cologne to the canon Wilhelm in 1375. von Tumburg. Das Anwesen gelangte an Wilhelm von Sombreffe, who in 1397 handed it over to the canon Gottfried Lordship of Heinsberg, Graf von Loon und) Chiny. Gottfried of Chiny sold it on the following year in 1398 to the canon and sub-dean Johannes II of Linnep (d. 1431), prior von St. Gereon. The Reifferscheider Hof was given the nickname Linneper Hof.

The Reifferscheider Hof came into the possession of the Cologne canon Dietrich von Linnep (d. 1461), the last male descendant (s of the lords of Linnep. Dietrich von Linnep was a son of Elisabeth von Sayn-Wittgenstein. After his death, the Reifferscheider or Linneper Hof aufm Domhofe came briefly into the possession of the cathedral provost Gottfried von Sayn-Wittgenstein as a hereditary monastery farm of the Cologne cathedral monastery (d. 1461). After his death, his brother, the vicar general Werner von Sayn-Wittgenstein (d. 1472), provost of St. Gereon, wanted to sell the hereditary estate of Reifferscheid (domus hereditarie de Rifferscheit) on the cathedral courtyard in August 1462 to the Cologne canon and Aachen provost Johann von Neuenahr (d. 1466), a son of the Cologne hereditary bailiff Gumprechts (II.) IV von Neuenahr (d. 1484) and grandson of Mechthild of Reifferscheidt. Johann von Neuenahr, however, did not want to live in the enclosure and left the house to the competent heirs. The farm was handed over one month later by the executors to cathedral chaplain (later cathedral provost) Georg I of Sayn-Wittgenstein (d. 1510).n. The latter presented him in 1477 to the Trier Archbishop John II of Baden (1434-1503, r. 1456), but "only for life". Archbishop Johann, who had just been appointed as Maximilians I of Austria's envoy had communicated the courtship of Mary of Burgundy in Ghent, was staying in Cologne at the same time as the Archduke, who was arriving for the betrothal, at the time the house was given to him and four days later on 23 July 1477 concluded a coinage agreement with Electoral Mainz, Electoral Palatinate and Jülich.

The Reifferscheid hof at the cathedral courtyard was given to the Cologne canon Dietrich II zu Nuenair (d. 1505) even before the death of Archbishop Johann, a grandson of Gumprecht (II) IV von Neuenahr and nephew von Dietrich of Linnep. His mother had been Eva von Linnep (d. 1483), a daughter of Elisabeth von Sayn-Wittgenstein, his father  (d. 1468). Presumably, the "hall" acquired by hereditary bailiff Gumprecht (II.) IV in 1442 was built during this time (palatio; Sciteey castle) near the "Hacht" on the cathedral yard together with the yard administered. As Dietrich II became provost of Soest in 1499, he declared that the Reifferscheid hof in Cologne, which had been left to him, should revert to the Count's House of Wittgenstein.

The Linneper Hof fell a few years later to a grandson of Eva von Linnep, the canon Friedrich d. He was considered the next heir in the clerical estate of Dietrich von Linnep, a canon who died in 1461. In 1518, the canon at St. Gereon's Basilica, Cologne Leonhard Maiss († 1528) "out of friendship" to the Neuenahr counts to build six new interest houses (tenements) in front of the Reifferscheider Hof on the Domhof at his expense for 600 florins, as the houses formerly standing there had fallen into disrepair and a vacant lot had been created. The interest houses had a common wall with the Linneper Hof. (d. 1552) and Amalie von Wertheim (1460-1532), the widow of the hereditary bailiff  Gumprecht (I. ;III.) von Neuenahr-Alpen (1465-1504), assured Maiss as guardians of Friedrich d J. von Neuenahr in return a pension of 30 gulden; the court was to be an "erffhoff des neisten gebloitz und stampz Lynnep doemherr zu Coele".

In 1528, hereditary bailiff Gumprecht (II., IV.) VI. von Neuenahr-Alpen (d. 1555), as the only brother of Friedrich who had died in the previous year, finally renounced the "Erbklosterhof, later called Reifferscheider and now Linneper Hof, on the cathedral court at Cologne", in favour of Domkeppler Georg von Sayn-Wittgenstein (. 1558) as the next ecclesiastical heir of the Lords of Linnep. Bernhardt Maeß, canon of St. Gereon in Cologne, agreed to waive 200 gold florins which he had invested in the Linneper Hof or the tenements connected with it in the cathedral courtyard of Cologne, if later on the sons of Count Gumprecht became canons. As late as 1532 Gumprecht (II., IV.)- VI was still using the house. In the following years, Georg von Sayn-Wittgenstein appears as the owner of the Hof.

In 1534, the Lenneper''' was rented to the burgher Mathias Vorsbach (d. 1557), who lived there with his wife Jutta von Lachem (d. after 1607; ∞ II Helmig von Siegburg) and his family. Matthias Vorsbach was tried from 1551 onwards for not having his child baptised as an infant; he died in prison in Brühl. Georg von Sayn-Wittgenstein placed the Linneper Hof at the disposal of the cathedral dean and later archbishop Gebhard I von Mansfeld-Vorderort in 1552. (1524-1562, r. 1558).

The seminary was moved in 1827 and the building on the Domhof was demolished in 1864.

 Sources
 Historisches Archiv der Stadt Köln (Bestand 101 Schreinsbücher, Hacht A 413–426; Bestand 202H Schreinsurkunden Hacht; Bestand 102V Schreinsurkunden Schöffenschrein among others)
 Erzbischof Heinrich v. Cöln schenkt dem Domcapitel zu einer Canonical-Wohnung das Haus auf dem Domhof, der alte Pallast genannt, bei der Johannis-Capelle …, Februar 1237. In Theodor Joseph Lacomblet (collab.): Urkundenbuch für die Geschichte des Niederrheins, vol. II. Wolf, Düsseldorf 1846, Nr. 226, 
 Klaus Militzer (collab.): Die Protokolle des Kölner Domkapitels, vol. I Regesten 1454–1511 (Publications of the Society for Rhenish Historical Studies 77). Droste, Düsseldorf 2009
 Statut des Domstiftes von Köln. 1534 November 6. In Samuel Muller Das Eigentum an den Domcurien der deutschen Stifter. In Westdeutsche Zeitschrift für Geschichte und Kunst 10 (1891), .
 Günter Aders (collab.): Urkunden und Akten der Neuenahrer Herrschaften und Besitzungen Alpen, Bedburg, Hackenbroich, Helpenstein, Linnep, Wevelinghoven und Wülfrath sowie der Erbvogtei Köln. (Inventare nichtstaatlicher Archive 21). Landschaftsverband Rheinland, Köln 1977 (PDF des Landschaftsverbandes Rheinland)

 References 

 Further reading 
 Johannes Krudewig: Verzeichnis der im Historischen Archiv und im Historischen Museum vorhandenen Pläne und Ansichten zur Geschichte der Stadt Köln und ihrer Umgebung. In Mitteilungen aus dem Stadtarchiv von Köln 31 (1902), 
 : Topographie der Stadt Köln im Mittelalter (Preis-Schriften der Mevissen-Stiftung 2), vol. I and II. Hanstein, Bonn 1910 (reprint: Droste, Düsseldorf 1986) 
 Klaus Militzer: Grundstücksübertragungen im Kölner Hachtbezirk im 13.-15. Jahrhundert. In Katharina Colberg (ed.): Staat und Gesellschaft in Mittelalter und Früher Neuzeit''. (Gedenkschrift Joachim Leuschner). Vandenhoeck & Ruprecht, Göttingen 1983, 

Buildings and structures demolished in the 1740s